Bryde Island is an island  long and  wide, lying immediately south-west of Lemaire Island, off the west coast of Graham Land, Antarctica. It was discovered by the Belgian Antarctic Expedition (BelgAE) under Adrien de Gerlache, 1897–99, and named for Ingvald Bryde, Norwegian agent who arranged the purchase of the expedition ship Belgica.

Alvaro Cove is a cove on the north side of Bryde Island. The feature was surveyed by the Argentine Antarctic Expedition, 1950–51, and named after a staff officer with the relief ship of the expedition.

Killermet Cove is the southernmost of two coves indenting the west side of Bryde Island. The cove was first documented on an Argentine government chart of 1950. It was named by the UK Antarctic Place-Names Committee (UK-APC) in 1960 because three members of the Falkland Islands Dependencies Survey (FIDS) were chased into this cove in their dinghies by six killer whales while circumnavigating Bryde Island in May 1957.

Rudolphy Point is the southwest point of Bryde Island. It was initially named by the Chilean Antarctic Expedition, 1950–51, after Captain Raul Rudolphy of the Chilean Navy, commander of the expedition transport ship Angamos.

See also
Argentino Channel
Gerlache Strait Geology

References

Islands of the Palmer Archipelago